Source Insight is a source code editor by Source Dynamics.  Source Insight provides syntax highlighting code navigation and customisable keyboard shortcuts. It bills itself not just as an editor but a tool to understand a large source code base, and for this reason is called "program editor and analyser." It provides features such as relation, context, and symbol windows. It also can display reference trees, class inheritance diagrams, and call trees, as it builds an internal database of symbolic information as it self-parses the source. Its greatest benefit is to speedup code comprehension on an unfamiliar project.

Novel features 
Source Insight provides all the features of the venerable cscope in a GUI environment along with a program editor. These C features are extended to object oriented domain and made more robust by being tolerant of the 'typedefs' or 'pragmas' of embedded processor C extensions. Further features such as 'ifdef support' and conditional parsing allows view of the code with inactive code visually and thus aiding speedy comprehension. As more code is added, Source Insight automatically keeps its database updated, displaying variables in different colors depending on if they are local, global, static, function arguments, or yet undefined.

History and usage 
It is a commercial software with a usual EULA. A 30-day trial version is available. Source Insight has a loyal user-base in the software industry as many long time users find it difficult to work without it. Source Insight has been a player for over 15 years but being Windows-only, its visibility has diminished somewhat, especially with the rise of cross-platform development and programmers being wedded to IDEs from their compiler vendor.

It is mentioned in the leaked Windows NT source code, Source Insight. (very powerful and comes on 1 floppy disk!)

Supported languages

Source Insight supports a wide variety of programming languages but is primarily geared towards C/C++, C# and Java.

See also
List of text editors
Comparison of text editors

References

External links
 Official Source Insight website

Code navigation tools
Windows text editors